Cape Bennett is a bold promontory at the northeast extremity of Coronation Island, in the South Orkney Islands.

It was discovered in December 1821 by Captain George Powell, a British sealer in the sloop Dove, and Captain Nathaniel Palmer, an American sealer in the sloop James Monroe. It was named after Powell's employer, David Bennett of Wapping, London.

Headlands of the South Orkney Islands